is a global automotive parts supplier with a focus on wire harnesses, instruments and components such as connectors and terminals. The company's origin and headquarters are in Japan, but in 2011, roughly 90% of its employees were outside the home country.

Yazaki ranks among the largest worldwide automotive suppliers, ranked 13th by the industry journal Automotive News in 2015.

The company's product lineup includes electrical cables, meter and auto instruments, gas equipment, air-conditioning, and solar-powered systems. As a first tier supplier, Yazaki sells chiefly to auto manufacturers, and, to a lesser extent, electric power, gas, and general construction companies. Yazaki is among the top 100 companies receiving the most US patents.

The Yazaki Group's corporate headquarters are located in the Mita-Kokusai Building (三田国際ビル Mita Kokusai Biru) in Mita, in Minato, Tokyo, Japan. Its main R&D center and its World Headquarters are located in the Y-city compound in Susono, Shizuoka prefecture. The company has its European headquarters in Cologne, Germany and the North American headquarters in Canton, Michigan, United States of America

History and expansion
Starting as a small Japanese family business selling wiring harnesses for automobiles in 1941, Yazaki Group in 2011 employs more than 192,000 people worldwide, with about 90% of them (171,000) outside Japan. After World War II, Yazaki focused on automotive wire harness production and grew rapidly. Overseas growth increased strongly between 1974 and the 1990s. There were external and internal reasons for this increase. The main external reason was the general trend of Japanese automotive companies to move production abroad to avoid trade sanctions in this period. This strategy change was accompanied by a change of leadership within Yazaki, when the young heir Yasuhiko Yazaki succeeded the founder Sadami Yazaki in 1974, aged only 33. Between 1974 and 1990, overseas sales grew roughly 30 times (from about ¥4 Billion in 1974 to ¥116 Billion), while overseas employees increased tenfold (from 2,922 to 33,703).

Main business areas
Yazaki's business is concentrated in the automotive industry and focuses on three areas: Electrical Distribution Systems (e.g. wire harnesses), Electronics & Instrumentation, and Components. As a first tier supplier, Yazaki interacts directly with car makers such as Toyota, Honda, GM, Ford, Stellantis, Tesla, Subaru, Nissan, Mazda, Jaguar Land Rover, PSA, etc. and coordinates parts of development, sub-component sourcing, testing and assembly.

Electrical Distribution Systems: Wire harness production is a labor-intensive process and requires high degrees of coordination of and closeness to the car manufacturer. Yazaki is among the global leaders in this area with a market share of close to 30%.

Electronics & Instrumentation: Yazaki provides Instrument Clusters, Display and Clock Modules, Power Distribution Boxes, as well as Body Electronics, Head Up Displays (HUD) and Combi Switches. The company also offers HMI solutions, and system support for Intelligent Electronic, Power & Signal Distribution.

Components: Yazaki develops and produces specialized automotive connectors and terminals.

Training
Every year Yazaki World Headquarters (Yazaki WHQ, located in Y-City, Susono, Japan) conducting two leadership training for all global affiliate plants.
1. YLDS (Yazaki Leadership Development Seminar) - for Junior management people
2. YGLP (Yazaki Global Leadership Seminar) - for senior management people

Controversies

Price fixing
On January 30, 2012, the US Justice Department announced after two years of investigation that it had discovered part of a massive price fixing scheme in which Denso and Yazaki played a significant role. The conspiracy, which fixed prices and allocated components to such car manufacturers as Toyota and Honda, extended from Michigan to Japan, where it was also under investigation. Denso agreed to pay a fine of $78 million. Yazaki agreed to pay a fine of $470 million, and four Yazaki executives were sentenced to prison and assessed a $20,000 fine each.

Operations in Russia
During the 2022 Russian invasion of Ukraine, Yazaki refused to join the international community and withdraw from the Russian market. Research from Yale University published on August 10, 2022 identifying how companies were reacting to Russia's invasion identified Yazaki in the worst category of "Digging in", meaning Defying Demands for Exit: companies defying demands for exit/reduction of activities.

References

External links

 Yazaki Group website 
 Yazaki North America official website 	
 Yazaki Europe official website 

Automotive companies based in Tokyo
Manufacturing companies based in Tokyo
Auto parts suppliers of Japan
Manufacturing companies established in 1929
Japanese companies established in 1929
Japanese brands
Multinational companies headquartered in Japan